Matthew Aldridge (born 11 March 1996) is a British rower. He won the gold medal in the coxless four at the 2022 European Rowing Championships.

References

External links
 

1996 births
Living people
British male rowers